Al Owaina (also spelled Leawaina and Al Uwaynah) is a village in Qatar located in the municipality of Al-Shahaniya. The closest sizable settlement is the industrial city of Dukhan.

Etymology
The name "Owaina" originated from the Arabic word "ain", which is the term used for a natural source of freshwater, and, in this case, was the name chosen for a nearby well after which the whole area derived its name from.

Infrastructure
Hejen Racing Committee maintains a camel hospital in the village called Tharb Camel Hospital. It is the first hospital of its kind in the country. The hospital doubles as a camel breeding center and is strategically located in the isolated west in order to avoid the negative effects of urbanization on the health of the camels.

UrbaCon General Contracting carried out the Leawaina Majlis Project to the improve infrastructure of the village in 2012.

References

Populated places in Al-Shahaniya